Tone Bender is the name of several fuzzboxes. Macari's Ltd, who also own the Sola Sound Brand, and who have built and sold the pedals since 1965 now own the Tone Bender trademark. 
Korg used to own Tone Bender trademarks in the 1990s.

Sola Sound Tone Bender MKI 

The first incarnation of the Tone Bender was a three transistor circuit based on the Gibson Maestro Fuzz-Tone.
Gary Hurst, a technician, began selling these in mid-1965. By September he was selling them through the Macari brothers' Musical Exchange shops.
Early incarnations were housed in wooden enclosures. Later on folded steel enclosures were used.

Sola Sound Tone Bender ("MK1.5") 

This version of the Tone Bender is a two transistor circuit, upon which the better known Arbiter Fuzz Face and Italian-made Vox Tone Bender are based.
It is essentially a negative feedback amplifier.

Although this was de facto a second version, no version number was used on its case. To differentiate it from the MKI and MKII, it is known as the "MK1.5" today.

This successor of the original Tone Bender was available, at the latest, by February 1966. The electronics are contained in a sand-cast aluminum enclosure, with sheet metal (steel) base plate.

It was also available in different guises as Sola Sound made OEM products or prototypes for other companies such as Rotosound. Another variant was the elusive Rangemaster Fuzzbug. Little is known about this unit. As Dallas Musical Ltd. had a 'Rangemaster' brand of products at the time, it is likely it had been made for that company.

The Arbiter Fuzz Face, which was released later in 1966, is a clone of an early variant of the Tone Bender MK1.5, that featured a 500k volume pot instead of the more common 100k, providing a fuller low end. The bias point was slightly adjusted to make it less susceptible to temperature changes.

Sola Sound Tone Bender Professional MKII 

The MKII Tone Bender is a three transistor circuit based on the MKI.V version, but with an additional amplifier gain stage.

Sola Sound produced the circuit for Vox, Marshall and RotoSound as well. These units were named Vox Tone Bender Professional MKII, Marshall Supa Fuzz, RotoSound Fuzz Box.
There also was a version of the short lived Rangemaster Fuzzbug containing this circuit. Other variants may exist.

The Sola Sound and Vox version used the same sturdy, sand cast metal enclosure designed by Hurst as the MK1.5 version. In fact, most Sola Sound branded MKIIs were probably leftover stock of MK1.5s with the circuit modified to MKII specs and a "Professional MKII" silkscreen added, presumably to differentiate them from the earlier version.
These MK1.5 conversions can be identified by their smaller circuit board. Only few Sola Sound branded units with a large circuit board exist. It seems the last of them were rebranded from Sola Sound to Vox. After that point only Vox branded Tone Bender Professional MKIIs seem to have been produced.

By November 1966 the pedal was being advertised in Beat Instrumental magazine, marketed as a "Gary Hurst Design". The circuit remained in production until early 1968. Marshall continued producing a slightly different looking version of the Supa Fuzz until at least 1972.

Most units used Mullard OC75 or Impex S31T transistors. Shortly before production ended a batch of pedals using Mullard OC81D audio driver transistors had been made. Most of these are branded Vox Tone Bender Professional MKII, but Rotosound Fuzz Boxes and Marshall Supa Fuzzes from that era do exist.

After being out of production for over 40 years, the Sola Sound Tone Bender Professional MKII is available again from Macari's since 2009 as part of their Vintage Series of pedals. It is being made by D*A*M Pedals, South Yorkshire.

Sola Sound Tone Bender MKIII, IV, Tone-Bender Fuzz 

The Sola Sound Tone Bender MKIII, and later Tone Bender MKIV,  featured a tone control. It's a three transistor circuit with a germanium diode, that came in several different enclosures and is closely related to the Burns Baldwin Buzzaround. It was available under different names and brands. Most MKIII Tone Benders are branded as Vox. The Sola Sound version is scarce. The Park Fuzz Sound and Rotosound Fuzz Box were also available with this circuit.  By 1969 the same circuit was sold in a smaller updated case as the Sola Sound Tone Bender MKIV. The larger MKIII version was sold concurrently. The Carlsbro Fuzz and Park Fuzz Sound were available in the MKIV enclosure as well. By 1971 the MKIV's graphics were updated, marketing the device as the "Tone-Bender Fuzz" from that point onwards. By the mid-70's it was also available in another different enclosure, branded as the CSL Super Fuzz. The circuit was discontinued around 1976 and reintroduced in 2012, once again with MKIV graphics.

A short lived version of the MKIII with only two controls, containing a circuit with four silicon transistors exists. It probably predates the more common germanium version.

Colorsound Supa Tonebender 

The Supa Tone Bender is a four transistor circuit, based on the Electro-Harmonix Big Muff π.

Colorsound Jumbo Tone Bender 

The Jumbo Tone Bender is a three transistor circuit based on the Electro-Harmonix Big Muff π. Sola Sound made this pedal under various names, in various enclosures and for various distributors. It can be found in a narrow Colorsound enclosure with the same graphics as the late germanium Tone Benders, a wide Colorsound enclosure, using Jumbo Tone Bender graphics, in Vox MKIII Tone Bender enclosures, in a different narrow enclosure rebranded as B&M (Champion) Fuzz, B&M Fuzz Unit, CMI Fuzz Unit, G.B. Fuzz, G.B. Fuzz Unit or Pro Traffic Fuzz Unit or in a smaller enclosure labeled as the Eurotec Black Box Fuzz Module. It was also part of the Colorsound Supa Wah-Fuzz-Swell.

The current "thin case" Tone Bender is using this circuit.

Vox Tone Bender 

The Vox Tone Bender (model no. V828 in Vox's 1966 US price list) is based on the same circuit topology as the MK1.5 version. It was made for Thomas Organ Co. by the Jen company in Italy.
This circuit uses different component values and transistor types making it different in tone and behavior. 
It used a PCB instead of the UK built MK1.5 which used strip board. Different transistor and capacitor setups have been used over the years. Earlier variants are fuller sounding, while later ones are rather bright and cutting.

It is assumed that these were initially made for the US market, while the Sola Sound made units were distributed in the UK and Europe.

JEN used the enclosures and circuit boards to make Fuzz for other companies such as Elka, Gretch and Luxor. They also released it under their own name of JEN and used the enclosure for a range of other effects.

References

External links 

 Macari's Musical Instruments of London
 D*A*M - Differential Audio Manifestationz
 Fuzz Central - Sola Sound ToneBender Professional MKII; schematics
 Fuzz Central - Colorsound Jumbo Tonebender; schematic
 Fuzz Central - Vox Tone Bender; schematics
 Effects Database - Gary Hurst Tone Bender MkI (wood)
 Effects Database - Gary Hurst Tone Bender MkI (metal)
 Effects Database - Sola Sound Tone Bender MkI
 Effects Database - Sola Sound Tone Bender Mk1.5
 Effects Database - Sola Sound Tone Bender MkII
 Effects Database - Sola Sound Tone Bender MkIII
 Effects Database - Sola Sound Tone Bender MkIV
 Effects Database - Colorsound Supa Tone Bender
 Effects Database - Colorsound Jumbo Tone Bender
 Gary Stewart Hurst Interview - NAMM Oral History Library (2011)

Effects units